Dmytro Ivanovych Yavornytsky (November 6, 1855, in Kharkiv Governorate, Russian Empire – August 5, 1940, in Dnipropetrovsk, Soviet Union) was a Russian Imperial and Ukrainian Soviet academician, historian, archeologist, ethnographer, folklorist, and lexicographer.

He was recognised as one of the most prominent researchers of the Zaporozhian Cossacks from the time of the Cossack Hetmanate, and the author of their first general history. In recognition of his many contributions to the preservation of Zaporozhian Host history and culture, he is widely known in historiography as "the father of the Zaporozhians".

Education and career 
Yavornitsky was born as Dmitry Evarnitsky. His father Ivan Yakimovich Evarnitsky (1827–1885) belonged to Russian Imperial nobility. Dmitry was educated at Kharkov University, Kazan, and Warsaw universities but his academic career was repeatedly interrupted for political reasons. Both as a student and later as a teacher, he was wrongly accused of "Ukrainian separatism" and dismissed from his position. In the 1890s, he was compelled to go to Russian Turkestan in order to find employment. In 1897, the Russian historian Vasily Klyuchevsky helped him to obtain a position as lecturer on the Zaporozhian Cossacks at Moscow University. In 1902, when he was offered a position as Director of the Yekaterinoslav Historical Museum in modern-day central Ukraine, he gladly accepted and remained there to the end of his life.

Historian 

As a historian, Yavornytsky displayed a romantic-antiquarian approach to his subject and was a conscious follower of his predecessor Mykola Kostomarov. He was an enthusiast who avidly sought out documents and material artifacts, as well as stories and the songs of the elderly, concerning the Zaporozhian Cossacks, and he wrote his histories on the basis of this material. He was a pioneer of Zaporozhian history and was the first to compile an extensive archive of materials on their entire history — from their origins, to their demise. He published much of this material in various collections, often at his own expense.

Yavornytsky's major work was the History of the Zaporozhian Cossacks which was published in Russian in three volumes between 1892 and 1897. He planned, but never completed, a fourth volume. In this and in his other works, he portrayed the Zaporozhians as representatives of Ukrainian liberty. Later Ukrainian historians criticized him as being uncritical and unsystematic in his collection of source materials (Mykhailo Hrushevsky) and lacking an appreciation for Ukrainian statehood (Dmytro Doroshenko), but Yavornytsky wrote at a time when political circumstances and the Imperial Russian censors were extremely oppressive and any synthesis of Ukrainian history which displayed an enthusiasm for the subject, let alone political independence, was highly suspect. His History of the Zaporozhian Cossacks was a pioneering work which did display such an enthusiasm.

Other scholarly interests 
Yavornytsky was a pioneer in the fields of ethnography, folkloristics, and lexicography. He made numerous contributions to the historical geography of the Zaporozhian lands, and mapped in detail the Dnieper River rapids with the locations of the various Zaporozhian Siches, or fortified headquarters. He published a large collection of Ukrainian folksongs (1906; partly reprinted, 1990) as soon as the censor would permit it, contributed to Borys Hrinchenko's great Ukrainian dictionary, and after the Russian Revolution began publication of one of his own (1920).

He increased the holdings of the Yekaterinoslav Museum from 5,000 to 80,000 items. Yavornytsky commissioned the best Ukrainian and Russian artists of his time (Opanas Slastion, Serhii Vasylkivsky, Nikolai Samokish, and Ilya Repin) to illustrate his various books, which were sometimes works of art in themselves. Especially notable in this regard is his From Ukrainian Antiquity (1900; reprinted in Ukrainian translation, 1991) which was lavishly illustrated in full colour and contained parallel texts in Russian and French so that it could be read abroad.

Legacy 
During the repressions of the 1930s under Joseph Stalin, Yavornytsky was prevented from publishing and had to keep a very low profile. During the Holodomor (the Ukrainian famine of 1932–33), he felt compelled to give away artifacts from his collections to obtain food for starving local peasants and others.

His death passed unnoticed both in the USSR and in the wider world. The Yekaterinoslav Museum was eventually renamed in his honour, as the Dmytro Yavornytsky National Historical Museum of Dnipro. He was partially rehabilitated during the Nikita Khrushchev and Petro Shelest eras. Materials about him began to appear, and in the early 1970s a four volume collection of his works was prepared for publication, supported by museum director Horpyna Vatchenko. Political circumstances again prevented this from happening, but with the advent of the Perestroika reforms in the late 1980s, new materials began to appear and his major works were republished. At that time, his History of the Zaporozhian Cossacks was reprinted both in Russian and in Ukrainian (1990–91). The Ukrainian edition contains numerous additional illustrations. In 2004, the first volume of his Collected Works in Twenty Volumes was published.  The first ten volumes of this collection will be dedicated to his historical, geographical, and archaeological works, while the second ten volumes will contain his works on folklore, ethnography, and language.

Today, Yavornytsky is still widely revered as "the father of the Zaporozhians".

In order to comply with decommunization laws the city of Dnipropetrovsk renamed its main street from Karl Marx Avenue to Yavornytskyi Avenue in February 2016.

Yavornytsky is portrayed on the painting of Ilya Repin's "The Satirical Reply of the Zaporozhian Cossacks to Sultan Mehmed IV of Turkey" as the secretary penning the letter to the Sultan. Repin consulted Yavornytsky during his work on the painting and made use of several artifacts from the historian's collection to use as accurate models.

References

Literature 
 Dmytro Doroshenko, "Survey of Ukrainian Historiography," Annals of the Ukrainian Academy of Arts and Sciences in the US, V-VI (1957), 242–4.
 Thomas M. Prymak, "Dmytro Yavornytsky and the Romance of Cossack History," Forum: A Ukrainian Review, no. 82 (Summer–Fall 1990), 17–23. This article is richly illustrated.

External links 
 Artworks by Dmitry Yavornitsky 
 Bibliography Dmitry Yavornitsky
 Dnipro National Historic Museum named D.I. Yavornitsky
 Yavornytsky, Dmytro. Biography. 
 Історія запорізьких козаків History of Zaporizhian Cossacks by Dmytro Yavornytsky .
 Interactive biography of Dmytro Yavornytsky (ukr.)

1855 births
1940 deaths
20th-century Ukrainian historians
People from Kharkiv Oblast
People from Kharkov Governorate
National University of Kharkiv alumni
Ukrainian Cossacks
Ukrainian ethnographers
Ukrainian lexicographers
Members of the National Academy of Sciences of Ukraine
Members of the Shevchenko Scientific Society
Ukrainian people in the Russian Empire
19th-century Ukrainian historians